Angela Carini (born 6 October 1998) is an Italian boxer. She competed at the 2020 Summer Olympics, in Women's welterweight.

Career 
She won a medal at the 2019 AIBA Women's World Boxing Championships.

Angela Carini is an athlete of Fiamme Oro.

References

1998 births
Living people
AIBA Women's World Boxing Championships medalists
Italian women boxers
Boxers from Naples
Light-welterweight boxers
Boxers of Fiamme Oro
Boxers at the 2020 Summer Olympics
Olympic boxers of Italy
21st-century Italian women